Year 1437 (MCDXXXVII) was a common year starting on Tuesday (link will display the full calendar) of the Julian calendar.

Events 
 January–December 
 February 20–21 – James I of Scotland is fatally stabbed at Perth in a failed coup by his uncle and former ally, Walter Stewart, Earl of Atholl.
 March 11–25 – Nova Scorpii AD 1437 is observed from Seoul, Korea. 
 March 25 – In a ceremony in Holyrood Abbey, James II of Scotland is crowned at the age of six by Pope Eugene IV. For security of the crown, the capital of Scotland is moved to Edinburgh, from Dunfermline.
 April 23 – Malmö in Denmark (now Sweden) receives its current coat of arms.
 June – A peasant army gathers at Bobâlna during the Transylvanian peasant revolt. The revolt will be crushed by January of next year.
 September 20–October 19 – A Portuguese attempt to conquer Tangier fails, and Prince Ferdinand is taken hostage.
 December 9 – Sigismund, Holy Roman Emperor, dies.

 Date unknown 
 Sandside Chase in the north of Scotland: Clan Mackay defeat the Clan Gunn of Caithness.
 The Kazan Khanate is established.
 Ulugh Beg's Zij-i Sultani star catalogue is published.

Births 
 March 7 – Anna of Saxony, Electress of Brandenburg (d. 1512)
 April 30 – János Thurzó, Hungarian businessman (d. 1508)
 July 22 – John Scrope, 5th Baron Scrope of Bolton, English Baron (d. 1498)
 October 4 – John IV, Duke of Bavaria (d. 1463)
 date unknown – Isaac Abravanel, Jewish statesman (d. 1508)
 probable – Elizabeth Woodville, Queen consort of King Edward IV of England (d. 1492)

Deaths 
 January 3 – Catherine of Valois, queen of Henry V of England (b. 1401)
 January 22 – Niccolò de' Niccoli, Italian Renaissance humanist (b. 1364)
 February 21 – King James I of Scotland (b. 1394) (murdered)
 March 26 – Walter Stewart, Earl of Atholl, Scottish nobleman and regicide (executed)
 June 10 – Joan of Navarre, Queen of England (b. 1370)
 November 20 – Thomas Langley, cardinal bishop of Durham and lord chancellor of England (b. 1363)
 December 9 – Sigismund, Holy Roman Emperor (b. 1368)
 date unknown – John II Stanley of the Isle of Man

References